The Snow Queen is a 1986 Finnish fantasy film directed by Päivi Hartzell, based on the eponymous 1844 fairy tale by Hans Christian Andersen. It was an exceptionally large film production at the time it was made in Finland, with a total cost of more than 6 million Finnish marks. The Finnish Film Foundation participated in the financing of the film with 2,885,000 Finnish marks.

The film was selected as the Finnish entry for the Best Foreign Language Film at the 60th Academy Awards, but was not accepted as a nominee.

Plot
The film tells about a girl named Kerttu and her journey to her friend Kai's place towards the magical kingdom of the Snow Queen. In order to rule the whole world, the Snow Queen wants the last green stone for her crown, but she can only achieve it with Kai's help. Worried Kerttu goes on a long and dangerous journey to her friend.

Cast
 Satu Silvo as Lumikuningatar
 Outi Vainionkulma as Kerttu
 Sebastian Kaatrasalo as Kai
 Tuula Nyman as Noita
 Esko Hukkanen as Narri
 Pirjo Bergström as Mielitietty
 Juulia Ukkonen as Prinsessa
 Paavo Westerberg as Prinssi

See also
 List of submissions to the 60th Academy Awards for Best Foreign Language Film
 List of Finnish submissions for the Academy Award for Best Foreign Language Film

References

External links
 

1986 films
1986 fantasy films
Finnish independent films
Finnish fantasy films
1980s Finnish-language films
Films based on The Snow Queen
Films set in Finland